Phineas Davis Farmstead is a historic farm complex and national historic district located in the village of Mexico in Oswego County, New York.  The district features an Italianate farmhouse built in 1874.  Also on the property is a historic henhouse and three stone hitching posts.

It was listed on the National Register of Historic Places in 1991.

References

Farms on the National Register of Historic Places in New York (state)
Historic districts on the National Register of Historic Places in New York (state)
Historic districts in Oswego County, New York
National Register of Historic Places in Oswego County, New York